Monda Market is a vegetable market located at Secunderabad in Hyderabad. It is said to have been established more than 100 years ago to cater to resident British army units.

It was one of the largest wholesale and retail markets in Hyderabad. No parking spaces are available. Officially about 375 traders have business in the Monda Market. GHMC has stated that due to poor conditions and inadequate facilities, the existing structure is to be demolished and a new multi-storied complex was to be constructed in its place. The proposal to shift the retail market was dropped after traders opposed the move.

Architecture 
The Monda Market is designed in the art deco style, with a clock tower overlooking the market.

References

External links 
 
 

Bazaars in Hyderabad, India
Buildings and structures in Secunderabad